Dice is the second extended play by South Korean singer Onew. It was released on April 11, 2022, through SM Entertainment. It consists of six tracks, including the lead single of the same name.

Background and release
Onew released his debut solo EP, Voice, in 2018, after which he enlisted in the military. His second EP was initially scheduled for a September 2021 release, before eventually being confirmed for April 2022, three years and four months after Voice. Onew took a greater role in the production process than on his first EP, and stated that he felt increased pressure as a result. Promotional materials, including video and image teasers, were released beginning March 31. Onew hosted a countdown livestream on Shinee's YouTube channel on April 11 to celebrate the EP's release. He promoted it with performances on M Countdown, Music Bank, Inkigayo and Show! Music Core, marking his first time engaging in promotional activities for a solo release.

Composition

Onew included songs from a wide range of genres in order to showcase his diversity as an artist. The six tracks on the EP represent the six sides of a dice, each reflecting different aspects of his artistry. Lead single "Dice" is a pop song that contains rhythmical guitar plucking and synth sounds. It is about betting on love despite knowing it's a game one will inevitably lose. "Sunshine" is an upbeat electronic pop song about embarking on a spontaneous trip and escaping from the monotony of daily life. It is guided by a bassline which is aided by an electric guitar. "On the Way" is a romantic song with a fantasy sound that utilises piano and guitar adlibs. The lyrics detail losing sleep at night, thinking about another person and wanting to go to them. "Love Phobia" is an alternative pop song that expresses scepticism about love while simultaneously desiring it. "Yeowoobi" is an emotional break-up song with a dreamlike yet lonely atmosphere. The lyrics compare feelings of love that are warm but sad to a rain shower in the sunlight. "In the Whale" is a midtempo pop song that takes the listener on a "metaphorical journey through the insides of a beast". The lyrics, written by Onew, express that he will always be by his fans' side, even in the darkness.

Critical reception 
 Dice received critical acclaim. Tássia Assis from NME gave Dice a 5 out of 5 stars, describing the EP as "multifaceted" as it offered a variety of sounds yet all six tracks sat together cohesively, which allowed Onew to showcase his true talent. She states that: "for a long time, and despite his proven talent, it felt like Onew stood in the shadows – or inside a whale, if you will – but the skies have cleared now. There’s a whole ocean to explore ahead. By taking a chance and trusting his own experience, Onew allows himself to shine in all his multifaceted glory." Sophia Simon-Bashall of The Line of Best Fit felt that the songs "showcase that Onew is an artist of variety" and praised his vocal delivery. She named "On the Way" and "Love Phobia" as album highlights.

Year-end lists

Track listing

Personnel
Credits adapted from the album liner notes.

 Onew – vocals, background vocals
 Hitchhiker – producer, director, guitar (tracks 1–2, 5), keyboard (tracks 1, 5), vocal directing (track 5), bass (track 5)
 Kenzie – vocal directing (track 1)
 Lee Min-gyu – recording (tracks 1, 4), mixing (track 4), digital editing (track 4), engineering for mix (track 5)
 No Min-ji – recording (tracks 1–2), digital editing (track 3)
 Lee Ji-hong – digital editing (track 1), recording (track 3)
 Jeong Eui-seok – mixing (track 1)
 Jeon Seung-woo – vocal directing (track 2)
 Kang Eun-ji – digital editing (track 2)
 An Chang-gyu – digital editing (track 2), digital editing (track 6)
 Kim Han-gu – mixing (track 2)
 Pollen – vocal directing (tracks 3, 6), background vocals (track 3)
 Jeong Yu-ra – recording (tracks 3–4, 6), digital editing (tracks 4, 6), mixing (track 6)
 Kim Cheol-sun – mixing (track 3)
 Sam Kim – background vocals (track 3)
 Adrian McKinnon – background vocals (track 3)
 Kim Yeon-seo – vocal directing (track 4)
 Kim Bu-min – vocal directing (track 5)
 Kwon Yu-jin – recording (track 5), digital editing (track 5)
 Jin Nam-koong – mixing (track 5)
 Kwon Nam-woo – mastering

Charts

Weekly charts

Monthly charts

Year-end charts

References

2022 EPs
Korean-language EPs
Onew EPs
SM Entertainment EPs